The 1977–78 season was the 32nd season in FK Partizan's existence. This article shows player statistics and matches that the club played during the 1977–78 season.

Players

Squad information
players (league matches/ league goals): Momčilo Vukotić (34/11)Nenad Stojković (34/3)Nikica Klinčarski (34/2)Petar Borota (34/0) -goalkeeper-Aleksandar Trifunović (32/5)Borislav Đurović (28/1)Boško Đorđević (27/5)Jusuf Hatunić (27/0)Milovan Jović (24/6)Ilija Zavišić (24/4)Xhevad Prekazi (22/2)Ivan Golac (19/1)Pavle Grubješić (17/3)Slobodan Santrač (16/11)Vladimir Pejović (15/0)Tomislav Kovačević (14/0)Dragan Arsenović (11/0)Rešad Kunovac (8/0)Refik Kozić (5/1)Novica Vulić (4/0)Aranđel Todorović (2/0)Miroslav Polak (1/0)

Friendlies

Competitions

Yugoslav First League

Yugoslav Cup

Mitropa Cup

Final

Statistics

Goalscorers 
This includes all competitive matches.

Score overview

See also
 List of FK Partizan seasons

References

External links
 Official website
 Partizanopedia 1977-78  (in Serbian)

FK Partizan seasons
Partizan
Yugoslav football championship-winning seasons